Frederick Francis IV (Friedrich Franz Michael; 9 April 1882 – 17 November 1945) was the last Grand Duke of Mecklenburg-Schwerin and regent of Mecklenburg-Strelitz. He inherited the throne when he was fifteen years old in 1897 and was forced to renounce it in 1918.

Early life

Born on 9 April 1882, Duke Frederick Francis IV was the son of Frederick Francis III, Grand Duke of Mecklenburg-Schwerin, then hereditary Grand duke, and Grand Duchess Anastasia Mikhailovna of Russia. He was born in Palermo, Sicily at Villa Belmonte where his parents were staying to alleviate the faltering health of the hereditary Grand duke. Frederick Francis's father suffered from a weak heart, chronic asthma, and acute eczema and had to live part of the year away from Mecklenburg in a warmer climate. Frederick Francis's mother, raised in the splendor of the Russian imperial court and the Orthodox church, never got used to the provincial austerity of the Lutheran court of Schwerin, preferring to live abroad.

Frederick Francis was one year old when he became the hereditary grand duke of Mecklenburg-Schwerin at the death of his grandfather Frederick Francis II, Grand Duke of Mecklenburg-Schwerin on 15 April 1883. Frederick Francis IV had an older sister, Alexandrine and a younger one, Cecilie. The three children were raised with simplicity and a lot of freedom by royal standards. Theirs was a polyglot household. The three siblings, who would remain very close throughout their lives, learned English, French, German and Russian. The family spent only half of the year in Schwerin during the summer months. They stayed as little time as possible in Schwerin Castle surrounded by a lake, preferring Gelbensande, a hunting lodge near Rostock and the Baltic Sea. There, the family led the simple life they preferred. Friederich Franz III spent most his time hunting, while Anastasia and the children rode or drove out, visited local people or enjoyed the beach and the surrounding forest. Every year from November until May, they lived in Villa Welden in Cannes where they sailed with their father and swam in the Mediterranean. On their journey back to Germany they stopped in Paris.

Grand Duke of Mecklenburg-Schwerin
Frederick Francis IV succeeded his father as Grand Duke upon his death on 10 April 1897. He had just turned fifteen the day before. As he was a teenager, due to his minority, the grand duchy was governed by his uncle Duke Johann Albrecht as regent. Frederick Francis's mother, Grand Duchess Anastasia preferred to remain in France while he continued the long preparation to eventually assume the throne. The following year, his older sister, Alexandrine married the Danish Crown Prince (future King Christian X in 1912). His mother and younger sister Cecile visited him frequently in Dresden and during their stays, they would go out for long drives in a carriage and horses bought for him from Schwerin. In 1903, the young Grand Duke moved to Bonn, where he attended university and studied administration and law. Adolf Langfeld was appointed as his study advisor.

On 9 April 1901 Frederick Francis came of age, ending the regency and beginning his reign in Schwerin. He immediately began working on a reform of the constitution, but it failed in the face of opposition from parliament.

Marriage and issue
On 7 June 1904, Frederick Francis married Princess Alexandra of Hanover and Cumberland in Gmunden. She was the second eldest daughter of Ernest Augustus, Crown Prince of Hanover, and his wife Princess Thyra of Denmark, a daughter of Christian IX of Denmark.

They had five children:

Hereditary Grand Duke Frederick Francis (22 April 1910 – 31 July 2001)
Duke Christian Ludwig (29 September 1912 – 18 July 1996) married Princess Barbara of Prussia, daughter of Prince Sigismund of Prussia
Duchess Olga (1916–1917)
Duchess Thyra (18 June 1919 – 27 September 1981)
Duchess Anastasia (11 November 1922 – 25 January 1979) married Prince Friedrich Ferdinand of Schleswig-Holstein-Sonderburg-Glücksburg

Abdication
Following the 1918 suicide of Grand Duke Adolphus Frederick VI of Mecklenburg-Strelitz, Frederick Francis took up the regency of Strelitz. This happened because the heir presumptive Duke Charles Michael was serving in the Russian Army at the time and had indicated that he wished to renounce his succession rights. Frederick Francis abdicated the grand ducal throne on 14 November 1918 following the German Empire's defeat in World War I; the regency ended at the same time.

After his abdication, he was initially not allowed to live in Mecklenburg and had to move to Denmark. A year later, he was permitted to return. He recovered some of his former properties and occupied some of his former homes. Frederick Francis died on 17 November 1945 in Flensburg after being arrested by No6 RAF Security section on 9 November 1945. He was succeeded as head of the grand ducal house by his son Hereditary Grand Duke Friedrich Franz.

Honours
German decorations

Foreign decorations

Ancestry

Notes

References
Beéche, Arturo and Hall, Coryne. Apapa: Christian IX of Denmark and his Descendants. Eurohistory.com, 2014. 
Zeepvat, Charlotte. The other Anastasia: A woman who loved and who lived. Royalty Digest Quarterly. N2 2006. ISSN 1653-5219.

1882 births
1945 deaths
Protestant monarchs
Dukes of Mecklenburg-Schwerin
House of Mecklenburg
German expatriates in Denmark
German expatriates in Italy
German expatriates in Austria
German landowners
Nobility from Palermo
Hereditary Grand Dukes of Mecklenburg-Schwerin
Grand Dukes of Mecklenburg-Schwerin
Monarchs who abdicated
Generals of Cavalry (Prussia)
Grand Crosses of the Order of Saint Stephen of Hungary
Recipients of the Cross of Honour of the Order of the Dannebrog
Recipients of the Order of the Netherlands Lion
Recipients of the Iron Cross (1914), 1st class